The discography of Taproot, an American alternative metal band, consists of six studio albums, one EP, twelve singles and eight music videos.

Albums

Studio albums

Independent albums

Singles

Guest appearances

Music videos

References

External links
 Official website
 Taproot at AllMusic
 

Rock music group discographies
Discographies of American artists
Heavy metal group discographies